The Helicopter Mountains are a series of rugged mountains west of Mount Mahony in the Saint Johns Range, rising to 1700 meters at Mount James and including also from west to east Touchstone Crag, Mick Peak and Hott Peak. The mountains form the northwest end of the Saint Johns Range. So named by the Advisory Committee on Antarctic Names in 2007 in recognition of the wide use of helicopters in supporting the U.S. Antarctic Program at McMurdo Sound and the McMurdo Dry Valleys. Peaks in the mountains have been named after personnel in the helicopter group.

References

Mountain ranges of Victoria Land